Fernando Lopes dos Santos Varela (born 26 November 1987) is a Cape Verdean professional footballer who plays mainly as a centre-back for Portuguese club Casa Pia.

Club career

Portugal

Born in Cascais, Varela started playing professionally with G.D. Estoril Praia in the Segunda Liga, being loaned to lowly U.D. Rio Maior for one year during his spell. In January 2009 he moved to C.D. Trofense, as the northern club was playing for the first time in the Primeira Liga. He managed to appear regularly during the season, but they were relegated.

In the summer of 2011, after two additional second-tier seasons with Trofense, Varela signed for C.D. Feirense, returned to the top flight after a 22-year absence. In the following campaign he played all league games as a starter, notably scoring twice against S.L. Benfica on 28 January 2012 (one in his own net) in a 1–2 loss where he also committed a penalty, and his team would again drop down a division.

Romania
Varela signed a three-year contract with Romanian side FC Vaslui on 29 May 2012. On 3 September of the following year he joined FC Steaua București also from Liga I, after agreeing to a three-year deal for a €1.25 million transfer fee.

At the end of 2014–15, Málaga CF showed interest in acquiring Varela, but Steaua rejected the Spaniards' €6 million offer. He appeared in 47 matches across all competitions, in an eventual double conquest.

PAOK

On 23 July 2016, Varela, who had less than six months left on his contract, moved to the Super League Greece with PAOK FC for three years and a €1.4 million fee. He scored his first goal in the 2017–18 season on 12 February 2018, heading home in a 3–0 win against Athlitiki Enosi Larissa F.C. at the Toumba Stadium.

On 21 May 2019, Varela declined the club's contract renewal offer.

International career

Portuguese-born, Varela opted to represent Cape Verde internationally, his debut coming in 2008. On 24 May 2010, he appeared in a friendly in Covilhã with Portugal – which were preparing for the FIFA World Cup in South Africa – playing the entire match as the minnows (ranked 117th) managed a 0–0 draw.

The Blue Sharks were disqualified from the 2014 World Cup when it was revealed that Varela had played in a qualifying match against Tunisia, despite not completing a four-match suspension for a red card he had received against Equatorial Guinea on 24 March 2013. That game was later rendered invalid by FIFA as a result of Equatorial Guinea fielding ineligible Emilio Nsue, but Varela's disciplinary record stood.

Career statistics

Club

International goals

Honours
Steaua București
Liga I: 2013–14, 2014–15
Cupa României: 2014–15
Cupa Ligii: 2014–15, 2015–16

PAOK
Super League Greece: 2018–19
Greek Football Cup: 2016–17, 2017–18, 2018–19, 2020–21

Individual
Foreign Player of the Year in Romania (Gazeta Sporturilor): 2015
Super League Greece Team of the Year: 2017–18, 2018–19

References

External links

1987 births
Living people
Portuguese people of Cape Verdean descent
Citizens of Cape Verde through descent
Sportspeople from Cascais
Cape Verdean footballers
Association football defenders
Primeira Liga players
Liga Portugal 2 players
Segunda Divisão players
G.D. Estoril Praia players
C.D. Trofense players
C.D. Feirense players
Casa Pia A.C. players
Liga I players
FC Vaslui players
FC Steaua București players
Super League Greece players
PAOK FC players
Cape Verde international footballers
2013 Africa Cup of Nations players
2015 Africa Cup of Nations players
Cape Verdean expatriate footballers
Expatriate footballers in Romania
Expatriate footballers in Greece
Cape Verdean expatriate sportspeople in Romania
Cape Verdean expatriate sportspeople in Greece